The Former Embassy of Iran in Washington, D.C. was the Imperial State of Iran's diplomatic mission to the United States. Direct bilateral Iran–United States relations between the two governments were severed following the Iranian Revolution in 1979, and the subsequent seizure of hostages at the U.S. Embassy in Tehran, Iran.

History
The chancery, a modernist building, was built in 1959. It is accompanied by a Georgian style structure that serves as the ambassador's residence. The complex is located in Washington, D.C.'s Embassy Row neighborhood.

During the age of the Shah, he attended numerous embassy functions there. The last resident Ambassador, Ardeshir Zahedi, cultivated a reputation of opulence, with star-studded parties and dinners. Famous figures who visited the embassy include Elizabeth Taylor, Andy Warhol, Barbara Walters, and Frank Sinatra. This was documented in 2013 by Iranian-American artist Eric Parnes, the first person in over 34 years to photograph the interior of the embassy.

The embassy complex continues to be de jure owned by the Government of Iran, but it has not been used by the Iranian government since April 7, 1980, and its buildings and grounds are currently maintained and de facto controlled by the U.S. Department of State. Other properties include the residence of the Iranian military attache, 3410 Garfield Street NW, and the residence of the Iranian Minister of Cultural Affairs, 2954 Upton Street NW. Six of ten buildings are being rented.

Iranian Interest Section of the Pakistani Embassy
Iran is now represented diplomatically through the Interests Section of the Islamic Republic of Iran in the United States located in the Pakistani Embassy.

See also
Embassy of the United States, Tehran
Foreign relations of Iran
Iran–United States relations
List of ambassadors of Iran to the United States

References

External links

"The iranian embassy shuttered for decades was known for hedonistic star studded gatherings", "Washington Post", December 8, 2013
"U.S. "Respects and Protects" Former Iranian Embassy", International Information Programs digital, Jane Morse, 26 October 2011
"Recalling Iran's former Embassy in Washington", The Polyglot, January 23, 2011
"Newsline: US is protecting former Iranian embassy building in DC", Diplomatic Briefing, January 12, 2011
Former Embassy of Iran, Wikimapia
https://www.flickr.com/photos/albinoflea/531708419/
wikimapia

Iran
Iran
Iran
Modernist architecture in Washington, D.C.
Washington, D.C.
1959 establishments in Washington, D.C.
Iran–United States relations
Iran–Pakistan relations
Pakistan–United States relations